The Highland Railway L class, also known as ‘Skye Bogies’ due to their association with the Kyle of Lochalsh Line. They were essentially mixed traffic versions of the earlier Duke or F class.

Construction
Nine were built at Lochgorm Works over the period 1882 to 1901. They were never named.

Dimensions
The  cylinders, valve gear and motion were common to the two classes, but they had smaller  driving wheels and higher pressure  boilers.

Numbering

References
 
 
 

L Class
4-4-0 locomotives
Railway locomotives introduced in 1882
Scrapped locomotives